Tim Eriksson (born February 5, 1982) is a professional Swedish ice hockey player. He has played a long time for Linköpings HC, but after the 07/08 season he went to Djurgårdens IF.

Career statistics

Regular season and playoffs

International

External links
 

1982 births
Djurgårdens IF Hockey players
Linköping HC players
Living people
Los Angeles Kings draft picks
Swedish ice hockey left wingers
People from Södertälje
Sportspeople from Stockholm County